The Peter Joplin Commercial Block is a historic commercial building at 426-443 Ouachita Street in Hot Springs, Arkansas.  It is a two-story masonry structure, with retail storefronts on the ground floor and offices above.  It is architecturally undistinguished, with nods toward the Tudor Revival in its styling.  Built in 1905, after a fire had swept through the area, it is one of the only buildings in the area to survive an even larger fire in 1913.  As such, it is a rare surviving example of early 20th century commercial architecture.

The building was listed on the National Register of Historic Places in 2000.

See also
National Register of Historic Places listings in Garland County, Arkansas

References

Commercial buildings on the National Register of Historic Places in Arkansas
Commercial buildings completed in 1913
Buildings and structures in Hot Springs, Arkansas
National Register of Historic Places in Hot Springs, Arkansas
1913 establishments in Arkansas